Lloyd R. Leith (December 7, 1902 – September 30, 1979) was an American basketball referee and high school coach. The San Francisco, California native officiated 16 NCAA Men's Division I Basketball Championships between 1939 and 1955. He also served as head coach at Balboa High School (1931–36), George Washington High School (1936–42) and Mission High School (1945–72).

External links 
Hall of Fame Entry at HoopHall.com

1902 births
1979 deaths
American men's basketball coaches
American men's basketball players
Basketball coaches from California
Basketball players from San Francisco
College men's basketball referees in the United States
High school basketball coaches in California
Naismith Memorial Basketball Hall of Fame inductees